"Feed My Frankenstein" is a song originally written and originally by British hard rock band Zodiac Mindwarp and the Love Reaction for their album Hoodlum Thunder. American singer Alice Cooper covered it on his 19th solo studio album, Hey Stoopid, and released it as a single in May 1992. Its highest chart position as a single was number 27 in the UK. Cooper gained a co-writer credit for his version due to different lyrics from the original.

The song was featured in the 1992 film Wayne's World, in which Cooper performs the song at a concert, and was featured on the film's soundtrack.

The double entendre lyric "fur tea cup" may reference a work by Méret Oppenheim, "Le Déjeuner en fourrure," currently in the MoMA collection.

Guest appearances on the track include Joe Satriani, Steve Vai, Nikki Sixx, and Elvira (Cassandra Peterson).

Personnel
 Alice Cooper – vocals
 Mickey Curry – drums
 Robert Bailey – keyboards
 Joe Satriani – guitar
 Steve Vai – guitar
 Nikki Sixx – bass

Charts

References

1991 songs
1992 singles
Alice Cooper songs
Epic Records singles
Song recordings produced by Peter Collins (record producer)
Songs about Frankenstein's monster
Songs written by Alice Cooper
Songs written by Nick Coler